Anisa (or Aniseh) Makhlouf (5 November 1930 – 6 February 2016) was the  matriarch of the Syrian Al-Assad family, which has ruled the country since 1971. The wife of the late Syrian President Hafez al-Assad, Makhlouf held the position of First Lady of Syria from 1971 until 2000. Her son Bashar al-Assad has been the President of Syria since 2000.

Biography
Makhlouf was born in Latakia, Syria, to the Makhloufs, an influential family from Bustan al-Basha, Latakia Governorate. She was the daughter of Ahmed Makhlouf and Saada Sulayman al-Assad, Hafez al-Assad's aunt.

She married Hafez al-Assad, an officer of the Syrian Arab Air Force, in 1957. They had five children: Bushra (b. 1960), Bassel al-Assad (1962–1994), Bashar al-Assad (b. 1965), Majd al-Assad (1966–2009), and Maher al-Assad (b. 1967). Her marriage to Hafez al-Assad elevated the status and wealth of the Makhlouf family. Her relatives were awarded lucrative contracts within the country's banking, oil and telecommunication sectors. One nephew, Rami Makhlouf, is believed to be the wealthiest man in Syria, with a net worth of US$5 billion, as of 2012.

According to the Tlass family, Hafez was never particularly fond of the staid and withdrawn Anisa, and had seriously considered divorcing her, or having a second wife used to entertain world leaders. One whose company he enjoyed more than Anisa was the more outgoing and affable Lamia Tlass, wife of Mustafa Tlass, who was also considering divorce due to his repeated infidelity.Following the death of Bassel al-Assad in 1994, Makhlouf favoured Maher al-Assad, her youngest son and a Syrian general, as a possible successor for her husband. Instead, Bashar al-Assad returned from London, joined the military, and succeeded his father as President of Syria in 2000.
The Economist described Anisa Makhlouf as "a formidable figure" within the al-Assad family and the Ba'athist government. A highly influential member of the government, she was one of the few people with whom Bashar al-Assad regularly consulted during the Syrian Civil War. She is believed to have advocated for a heavy, military crackdown on Syrian protesters and rebels during the ongoing Civil War.

In 2012, Makhlouf, as well as other members of the Al-Assad family, were sanctioned by the European Union amid the country's civil war and attacks on protesters by the Syrian government.

The EU sanctions included a travel ban and the freezing of her assets. Prior to the travel ban, she had reportedly made frequent trips to Germany for medical treatments for an undisclosed illness.

Death
Anisa Makhlouf died in Damascus on 6 February 2016 from undisclosed causes.

Bibliography

References

External links

Year of birth uncertain
Date of birth unknown
1930 births
2016 deaths
Disease-related deaths in Syria
First Ladies of Syria
Assad family
Syrian Alawites
Syrian expatriates in the United Arab Emirates
People from Latakia
People of the Syrian civil war